The Watchman or The Watchmen may refer to:

 The Watchman (Utah), a mountain in Zion National Park, Utah
 The Watchman (periodical), a 1796 periodical established and edited by Samuel Taylor Coleridge
 The Watchman (newspaper), a weekly newspaper published in Sydney, New South Wales, Australia
 The Watchman (Grubb novel), a 1961 novel by Davis Grubb
 The Watchman (Crais novel), a 2007 detective novel by Robert Crais
 The Watchman (album), a 1996 album by cellist Erik Friedlander
 The Watchman, a poem by Lucy Maud Montgomery
 The Watchmen (band)

See also 
 Watchman (disambiguation)